Basakin is a rural locality (a settlement) and the administrative center of Basakinskoye Rural Settlement, Chernyshkovsky District, Volgograd Oblast, Russia. The population was 1,041 as of 2010. There are 24 streets.

Geography 
Basakin is located 33 km south of Chernyshkovsky (the district's administrative centre) by road. Filatov is the nearest rural locality.

References 

Rural localities in Chernyshkovsky District